This article is one of a series providing information about endemism among birds in the world's various zoogeographic zones. For an overview of this subject see Endemism in birds.

Patterns of endemism 
This region is notable not just for the high number of endemic species, but for endemism in higher-level taxonomic groupings too.

Order-level endemism 

Two orders are endemic to Madagascar or the wider region:

 Mesites are placed within the Mesitornithiformes, an order containing three species in two genera.
 The cuckoo-roller is placed in the monotypic order Leptosomiformes. It is endemic to the wider region, as its single species is present on both Madagascar and Comores.

Family-level endemism 

The following three families are endemic to Madagascar:

 Ground-rollers, a family within the Coraciiformes, containing five species in three genera.
 Asities, a passerine family within the Old World suboscines, containing four species in two genera
 Malagasy Warblers, a passerine family within the Old World oscines, containing eleven species in eight genera.

One other family is endemic to the wider region:

 The vangas, an oscine passerine family, containing sixteen species in eleven genera are endemic to the region. All but one species are confined to Madagascar, the sole exception being the Comoro blue vanga, restricted to Comores.

Subfamily-level endemism 

 The nine species of coua (genus Coua, a subfamily of the cuckoos) are all Madagascan endemics.
 Two extinct species, the dodo of Mauritius and Rodrigues solitaire of Rodrigues are placed in the Raphinae (a subfamily of the doves and pigeons).
 the rock-thrushes, Monticola, in which three of the 13 species are endemic to Madagascar (these three are sometimes separated into their own genus, Pseudocossyphus).

Endemic Bird Areas 
In Madagascar, the total wealth of known terrestrial is about 5,800 species (and 2,500 pending description), and 86 percent are endemic to the island.

List of species

Species endemic to Madagascar 
The following is a list of species endemic to Madagascar.

Note that:
 Madagascar partridge is endemic as a native species to Madagascar, but has been introduced on the Mascarenes
 Madagascar buttonquail is endemic as a native species to Madagascar, but has been introduced on the Mascarenes
 Madagascar turtle dove is endemic as a native species to Madagascar, but is thought to be an introduced species on the other islands in the region
 Grey-headed lovebird is endemic as a native species to Madagascar, but has been introduced to the Comoro Islands
 Madagascar fody is endemic as a native species to Madagascar, but has been introduced to many of the other islands in the region
 The Elephant bird is now extinct.

Species endemic to other islands or island groups in the region 
The following is a list of species endemic to other islands.

Species endemic to the Mascarene group 
 Mauritius kestrel
 Pink pigeon
 Mauritius parakeet
 Mascarene swiftlet
 Réunion bulbul
 Mauritius bulbul
 Réunion stonechat
 Mascarene paradise flycatcher
 Rodrigues warbler
 Mauritius olive white-eye
 Réunion olive white-eye
 Mauritius grey white-eye
 Réunion grey white-eye
 Mauritius cuckoo-shrike
 Réunion cuckoo-shrike
 Mauritius fody
 Rodrigues fody

Species endemic to the Comoros 
 Comoro olive pigeon
 Comoro green pigeon
 Karthala scops-owl
 Anjouan scops-owl
 Anjouan cuckoo-roller
 Comoro bulbul
 Comoro thrush
 Humblot's flycatcher
 Comoro brush-warbler
 Benson's brush-warbler
 Kirk's white-eye
 Karthala white-eye
 Mayotte white-eye
 Comoro green sunbird
 Humblot's sunbird
 Anjouan sunbird
 Mayotte sunbird
 Comoro blue vanga
 Comoro cuckoo-shrike
 Mayotte drongo
 Grande Comore drongo
 Comoro fody

Species endemic to central Seychelles 
 Seychelles kestrel
 Seychelles blue pigeon
 Seychelles black parrot
 Seychelles scops-owl
 Seychelles swiftlet
 Seychelles magpie-robin
 Seychelles black paradise flycatcher
 Seychelles warbler
 Seychelles white-eye
 Seychelles sunbird
 Seychelles fody

Species endemic to the Aldabra islands 
 Aldabra rail
 Aldabra brush-warbler
 Abbott's sunbird
 Aldabra drongo
 Aldabra fody

There are native Madagascar turtle doves in the Aldabra group (separate races from those found on Madagascar); they may represent a separate species.

Other species endemic to the region 
The following is a list of species which are not endemic to a specific island (or island group) but are endemic to the region as a whole.

 Malagasy sacred ibis (Aldabra, western coast of Madagascar)
 Réunion harrier (Madagascar, Comoros, Mascarenes)
 Frances's sparrowhawk (Madagascar, Comoros)
 Malagasy kestrel (Madagascar, Aldabra)
 Comoro blue pigeon (Comoros, Aldabra)
 Greater vasa parrot (Madagascar, Comoros)
 Lesser vasa parrot (Madagascar, Comoros)
 Malagasy coucal (Madagascar, Aldabra)
 Madagascar scops owl (Madagascar, Comoros)
 Madagascar nightjar (Madagascar, Aldabra)
 Madagascar black swift (Madagascar, Comoros)
 Madagascar spine-tailed swift (Madagascar, Comoros)
 Madagascar kingfisher (Madagascar, Comoros)
 Madagascar bee-eater (Madagascar, Comoros)
 Madagascar cuckoo-roller (Madagascar, Comoros)
 Mascarene martin (Madagascar, Mascarenes)
 Malagasy bulbul (Madagascar, Comoros, Aldabra)
 Malagasy paradise flycatcher (Madagascar, Comoros)
 Madagascar cisticola (Madagascar, Aldabra group)
 Malagasy brush-warbler (Madagascar, Mohéli, Anjouan)
 Malagasy white-eye (Madagascar, various other islands)
 Madagascar green sunbird (Madagascar, Mohéli)
 Souimanga sunbird (Aldabra, Madagascar)
 Crested drongo (Madagascar, Anjouan)

Near-endemics 
The following is a list of species endemic to the region as breeding species:

 Madagascar squacco heron (breeding endemic on Madagascar & Aldabra, migrates to East Africa)
 Madagascar lesser cuckoo (endemic to Madagascar in the breeding season, winters in East Africa).

Two Western Palearctic falcons winter entirely (Eleonora's falcon) or mainly (sooty falcon) on Madagascar.

References 

 Sinclair, Ian and Olivier Langrand (2003) Birds of the Indian Ocean Islands

Madagascar
Madagascar and western Indian Ocean islands